MKSSS's Cummins College of Engineering for Women (CCOEW) is an Autonomous engineering college in Pune, Maharashtra, India established in 1991 and run by the Maharshi Karve Stree Shikshan Samstha.

History 
Started in the year 1991 by the  Maharshi Karve Stree Shikshan Samshta, a 113‑year‑old institution, that has a century long history dedicated to the upliftment of women by educating them and making them self-reliant, it was renamed after Cummins India Foundation gave a substantial donation. CCOEW is affiliated to the University of Pune and also offers technical courses affiliated to All India Council for Technical Education (AICTE).

Rankings

The National Institutional Ranking Framework (NIRF) ranked it 173 among engineering colleges in 2020.

Entrepreneurship Development Cell 

E-cell is a club for improving the entrepreneurship skills  of its members. Various events for improving entrepreneurship skills are conducted throughout the year. It is a part of National Entrepreneurship Network (NEN).

References

External links 
https://web.archive.org/web/20120212214804/http://cumminscollege.org/about-us/the-college/
http://www.minglebox.com/college/M-K-S-S-S-s-Cummins-College-of-Engineering-For-Women-Pune-Cummins-P
Engineering success: Girls storm another male bastion

Women's engineering colleges in India
Women's universities and colleges in Maharashtra
Engineering colleges in Pune
Colleges affiliated to Savitribai Phule Pune University